The Henningsvær Bridges are two box girder cantilever bridges made of prestressed concrete.  The bridges connect the fishing village and island of Henningsvær to the rest of Vågan Municipality on the main island of Austvågøya in Nordland county, Norway.

The two bridges are called the Engøysundet Bridge and Henningsvær Bridge. The bridges were opened in 1983. They are among the many bridges that connect the islands of Lofoten to each other.

See also
List of bridges in Norway
List of bridges in Norway by length
List of bridges
List of bridges by length

References

Vågan
Road bridges in Nordland
Bridges completed in 1983
1983 establishments in Norway
Roads within the Arctic Circle